A twig is a thin, often short, branch of a tree or bush.

The buds on the twig are an important diagnostic characteristic, as are the abscission scars where the leaves have fallen away. The color, texture, and patterning of the twig bark are also important, in addition to the thickness and nature of any pith of the twig.

There are two types of twig: vegetative twigs and fruiting spurs. Fruiting spurs are specialized twigs that generally branch off the sides of branches and are stubby and slow-growing, with many annular ring markings from seasons past. The age and rate of growth of a twig can be determined by counting the winter terminal bud scale scars, or annular ring marking, down the length of the twig.

Twigs can be useful in starting fire. They can be used as kindling wood, bridging the gap between highly flammable tinder (dry grass and leaves) and firewood.

References

Plant morphology
Building materials